Rečani may refer to:

Rečani, Zajas, a village in Kičevo Municipality, North Macedonia
, a village in Kičevo Municipality, North Macedonia
, a village in Kočani Municipality, North Macedonia

See also
, a village in Smolyan Municipality, Bulgaria
Rečane (disambiguation)